The Honour of Richmond (or English feudal barony of Richmond) in north-west Yorkshire, England was granted to Count Alan Rufus (also known as Alain le Roux) by King William the Conqueror sometime during 1069 to 1071, although the date is uncertain. It was gifted as thanks for his services at the Conquest. The extensive district was previously held by Edwin, Earl of Mercia who died in 1071. The district is probably mentioned in the Domesday Book of 1086 but its limits are uncertain.

The honour comprised 60 knight's fees and was one of the most important fiefdoms in Norman England. According to the 14th-century Genealogia of the lords of Richmond, Alan Rufus built a stronghold in the district. The buildings were later known as Richmond Castle which is alluded to in the Domesday survey as forming a ‘castlery’.

Territory 

The district consisted of three main land divisions; the wapentakes of Hang, of Gilling and of Hallikeld. The first two of these correspond to later medieval civil land divisions or wapentakes: the third is less easily defined.

The Gilling territory consisted mainly of land which lay between the River Tees and the River Swale, with the Tees forming the northern border which separated the land from that granted to the Bishop of Durham. The western border was the watershed of the Pennine Hills and the southern border was the watershed between the River Ure and the Swale. The River Wiske formed the eastern border. The manor of Gilling, close to the boundary, was the caput of the barony until Count Alan moved it to Richmond Castle. The division of Hang, or Hangshire, had the River Swale as its northern boundary; its western boundary was the Pennine watershed and its southern boundary was the watershed with the River Wharfe and the River Nidd. The eastern border followed small streams and minor landmarks from the previous watershed to the Swale. The wapentake meeting place was situated on the Hang Beck in Finghall parish. The third part of the territory, Hallikeld, consisted of the parishes lying between the River Ure and the River Swale until their confluence at Ellenthorpe.

Richmond castle was in ruins by 1540 but was restored centuries later and is now a tourist attraction.

List of feudal barons of Richmond
The feudal barons of Richmond were usually referred to as Lords of Richmond. The Honour of Richmond was sometimes held separately from the titles Earl of Richmond, and later Duke of Richmond. Grants were sometimes partial, and sometimes included or excluded Richmond Castle as noted in the list below. The descent of the barony was as follows:
 Alan Rufus, Count of Brittany (d.1093), who died without progeny.
 Alan the Black (d.1098), brother of Alan Rufus, who also died without progeny.
 Stephen, Count of Tréguier (d. 1135/6), brother.
 Alan, 1st Earl of Richmond (d.1146),  (alias Alan The Black, or le Noir), younger son.
 Conan IV, Duke of Brittany (d.1171), son, who left as his heir a daughter Constance (d.1201), a ward of the king.
 Held in wardship by King Henry II pending the marriage of his son Geoffrey to Constance, the daughter of Conan IV
 Constance, Duchess of Brittany (d.1201), Conan's daughter and hereditary Countess of Richmond
 Geoffrey II, Duke of Brittany(d.1186) first husband of Constance
 Ranulph, Earl of Chester (d.1232), second husband of Constance, whom she married in 1188 and whom she divorced in 1199.
 Guy of Thouars – third husband of Constance; forfeited to King John in 1203 upon taking up arms with the French to avenge the death of Arthur I
 Alix, Duchess of Brittany (d. 1221), Constance and Guy's elder daughter.
 Eleanor of Brittany, Constance and Geoffrey's elder daughter. She ceased to be styled as Countess of Richmond in 1218.
 Peter I, Duke of Brittany (alias Pierre Mauclerc), the husband of Alix of Thouars and the son-in-law of Guy of Thouars and Constance of Brittany. He declined an offer of the Honour and the Earldom of Richmond from King John (1199–1216) due to his loyalty to the French King. He received in 1218 from William Marshal, 1st Earl of Pembroke in name of King Henry III a partial grant of the Honour, excepting 30 knight's fees south of the River Trent retained by the king, His lands were forfeited to King Henry III when he paid homage to French King Louis IX in 1235. Thus his tenure of the barony varied according to his allegiance in the war between England and France. 
 William of Savoy, Bishop elect of Valence, granted the Honour in August 1236.
 Peter II, Count of Savoy, popularly known as Earl of Richmond, to whom the barony was granted by King Henry III in 1240. He sought and received a royal confirmation of his holding in 1262. He had felt his tenure at risk due to the negotiations for the marriage of Beatrice, daughter of King Henry III to John, son of John I, Duke of Brittany (d.1286) who was son of Alix, Duchess of Brittany. A part of this marriage settlement stipulated that his father the duke should receive French lands equal in value to the honour of Richmond. He lost control of the barony in 1264, although he received income from it until 1266, when the barony was granted to John of Brittany, husband of Beatrice.
 John II, Duke of Brittany (d.1305), husband of Princess Beatrice.
 John of Brittany, Earl of Richmond (d.1334), son. He died unmarried without progeny.
 John III, Duke of Brittany (1286–1341), nephew
 John de Montfort, Earl of Richmond – upon his death,  Earldom returned to the crown in 1342; it remained with the crown during most of the Breton War of Succession in part to ensure it would not fall into the hands of the King of France.
 John of Gaunt – surrendered the Earldom and Honour, at the insistence of the King, to pursue Kingship of Castille
 John IV, Duke of Brittany, son and heir of John of Montfort; forfeited twice, in 1381 (due to the First Treaty of Guerande) and 1384 upon paying homage to French King Charles VI; the second forfeit represented the permanent loss of the Honour and the Earldom by the Dukes of Brittany.
 Anne of Bohemia
 Ralph de Neville, 1st Earl of Westmorland – Honour held for life without peerage Earl of Richmond
 John of Lancaster, 1st Duke of Bedford and 1st Earl of Richmond
 reverted to the Crown (1435–1450)
 Ralph Neville, Earl of Westmoreland – partial grant of Richmond Castle in 1450
 Edmund Tudor, 1st Earl of Richmond – father of Henry VII
 Henry Tudor – forfeited to Edward IV
 George Plantagenet, 1st Duke of Clarence – granted Honour and castle without peerage Earl of Richmond by Edward IV in 1462
 Richard, Duke of Gloucester – retained upon becoming Richard III of England
 Henry Tudor – regained the Honour upon winning the crown of England in contest with Richard III; Honour merged with the Crown
 Held by members of Tudor and Stuart Dynasties
 Charles Lennox – conferred on Lennox Family in 1675 by Charles Lennox's father Charles II

Notes

References

External links

History of Yorkshire
Honours (feudal barony)
Honour